OJSC "Holding Management Company "Belkommunmash" (Belkamunmash), is a Belarusian manufacturer of electric public transport vehicles. The enterprise was based on a tram and trolleybus repair facility which was opened in 1973. Today it is the leading industrial enterprise in Belarus in the field of manufacture and major overhaul of rolling stock for electric transportation in cities. Trolleybuses manufactured by Belkommunmash are operated in 7 cities in Belarus and over 40 cities in Russia, Ukraine, Kazakhstan, Kyrgyzstan, Latvia, Mongolia, Moldova, Argentina, Bulgaria, Bosnia and Herzegovina and Serbia.

Electric bus 
 Е420
 Е433
 Е321

Trams

Duobus 
 Vitovt Max Duo

Trolleybuses

Hybrid buses

References

External links 

 Official site

Belarusian brands
Bus manufacturers of Belarus
Bus manufacturers of the Soviet Union
Tram manufacturers
Trolleybus manufacturers
Electric vehicle manufacturers of Belarus